Amy Adler (born 1966) is an American visual artist. She works in multiple mediums, using photography, film and drawing. She is currently a professor of Visual Arts at the University of California, San Diego.

She has had one-person shows at the Museum of Contemporary Art, Los Angeles, the Museum of Contemporary Art San Diego and The Aspen Art Museum as well as galleries worldwide.

Early life
Adler was born in 1966 and raised in New York City. She attended The High School of Music & Art (now known as the Fiorello H. LaGuardia High School) in Manhattan, and graduated in 1984. Adler graduated from Cooper Union and received an MFA in Visual Arts from UCLA and an MFA in Cinematic Arts from USC.

Works
Adler's photographs are shot from her own drawings. In the 1990s, she developed a translation process, from photography to drawing back to photography. The final product, a unique photographic print of the drawing, became the original. The original drawings for the photographs, were destroyed. This is to be understood as a production process that puts the notions of authenticity and original in question and expanded.

In 2006, Adler inverted this process and now displays the original drawings, but always in relation to the intervention of media. For example, in her oil pastel drawings entitled, Location, from 2014, she uses location shots as source material for her drawings.
In her drawings and photographs, Amy Adler has always worked intensively with the medium of film. During her study of Cinematic Arts at USC from 2009 to 2012 she began making her own films. In 2012 she directed the 26-minute documentary Mein Schloss, and in 2016 she directed the 15 minute fiction film, Tear Jerker.

Exhibitions
Adler's first one-person museum show was at the Museum of Contemporary Art Los Angeles in 1998 as part of their "Focus Series". Other solo shows include a "Hammer Project" at the UCLA Hammer Museum, where her project, Amy Adler Photographs Leonardo DiCaprio, was on display in 2002, solo shows at the Museum of Contemporary Art San Diego, The Aspen Art Museum in 2006, and a solo project at the Drammens Art Museum in Norway in 2012.

In the spring of 2005 Twin Palms Press released a monograph of her work entitled, "Amy Adler Young Photographer".

Her work is included in several permanent collections including The Broad, The UCLA Hammer Museum, and The Museum of Contemporary Art Los Angeles.

Public collections
Adler's work is in the permanent collections of the Deste Foundation, LA County Museum of Art, Pérez Art Museum, and the Santa Barbara Museum of Art.

Bibliography

Literature
Amy Adler at play with forms at once concrete and abstract (The Los Angeles Times,Sharon Mizota, Nov 2014)
A Roving Locus: A Conversation with Amy Adler
Amy Adler: at Acme (Art In America, Michael Duncan, March 2008)
Aspen Art Museum (Amy Adler: Make Believe, Heidi Zuckerman Jacobson, 2007)
CD, drawings by Amy Adler Heidi Zuckerman Jacobson, Liner Notes "Amy Cook, The Sky Observer√¢‚Ç¨‚Ñ¢s Guide",
Museum of Contemporary Art San Diego (Rachel Teagle. "Cerca Series: Amy Adler", 2006)
Adults intrude into make-believe (The Los Angeles Times, David Pagel, September 2005)
Twin Palms Publishers (Cay Sophie Rabinowitz, Amy Adler Young Photographer, 2005)
Photos of Drawings of Photos:DiCaprio Twice Removed (The Los Angeles Times, Christopher Knight, February 2002)
UCLA Hammer Museum, Los Angeles, CA (Claudine Ise, "Amy Adler Photographs Leonardo DiCaprio", 2002)
Contemporary Arts Museum, Houston (Paola Morsiani, "Relative Positions: Amy Adler, Liza May Post, Francesca Woodman, 2001)
Art in Review: Amy Adler (The New York Times, Roberta Smith, May 2000)
Amy Adler curates Joni Mitchell (Artext, Malik Gaines, May 2000)
A Thousand Words: Amy Adler (Artforum, M.G. Lord, April 1999)
Amy Adler: Surrogates (Artext, Liz Kotz, May–July 1998)
Reflecting on Life's Darker Side: Amy Adler (The Los Angeles Times, Christopher Knight, December 1998)
Museum of Contemporary Art, Los Angeles, CA (Connie Butler, " Amy Adler", 1998)
Amy Adler (Time Out New York, Linda Yablonsky, September 1997)
Amy Adler (Artforum, Ingrid Schaffner, November 1996)
Enter Youth, With Subtlety (The New York Times, Roberta Smith, May 1996)

References

External links 

 

1966 births
Artists from Los Angeles
Artists from New York City
Cooper Union alumni
Living people
UCLA Film School alumni
University of California, San Diego faculty
USC School of Cinematic Arts alumni
The High School of Music & Art alumni